Myotis diminutus is a species of mouse-eared bat found in Ecuador and Colombia. It was recently described as a new species in 2011.

Taxonomy and etymology
Myotis diminutus was described as a new species in 2011 by Moratelli and Wilson.
The species name "diminutus" is Latin for "diminutive". Moratelli and Wilson selected this name because M. diminutus was the smallest species of mouse-eared bat yet described in South America.

Description
Superficially, M. diminutus is similar to the black myotis in appearance.
Very few individuals have ever been documented.
It has silky, cinnamon-brown fur.
Its skull lacks a sagittal crest.

Range
The species was first documented in Ecuador. However, a review of museum specimens identified a second individual that had been collected in the Nariño Department of Colombia in 1959.

References

Mouse-eared bats
Bats of South America
Mammals described in 2011